KTXD could refer to:

KTXD-LP, a low power Television station licensed to Amarillo, Texas, United States
KTXD-TV, a television station licensed to Greenville, Texas, United States formerly named KTAQ-TV